Eosalmo is an extinct genus of ancient salmonid that lived during the Eocene epoch.

The genus was first described in 1977 from fossils found in lacustrine deposits in Driftwood Canyon Provincial Park, near Smithers, British Columbia, Canada, leading to the specific epithet E. driftwoodensis. Fossils from this genus have also been found at sites in Princeton, British Columbia, the McAbee Fossil Beds in B.C., and Republic, Washington, United States.

When first described the genus was thought to be intermediate in form to the extant salmonid subfamilies Salmoninae (trout and salmon) and Thymallinae (graylings).  More recent review of the genus has placed Eosalmo as the most primitive member of the Salmoninae subfamily.  Fossils found in Driftwood Canyon Provincial Park display a full range of individuals from young juveniles through adults.  This range indicates that the genus was completely freshwater dwelling and did not spend time in saltwater.

Morphology
Several unique characters found in Eosalmo separate the genus from extant salmonids.  The subopercle exhibits an anetrodorsal process which meets the edge of the subopercle at approximately a 60° angle. Also unique is the basihyal tooth plate, which is broad, flat, thin, and lacking any teeth along the edges.  Modern salmonids possess stout teeth along the edge of the basihyal.  The morphology suggests Eosalmo represents an intermediate between the modern Salmoninae and Thymallinae subfamilies and evolved from a grayling like ancestor.

See also

 Prehistoric fish
 List of prehistoric bony fish genera

References

Eocene fish
Salmonidae
Extinct animals of North America
Prehistoric fish genera
Fossil taxa described in 1977